David Liederman (b 1949, New York, New York) is a chef and businessman. He is best known for creating David's Cookies company (owned by Fairfield Gourmet Foods Corporation ), which produces a line of desserts, baked goods and cookie dough. Since 1996, however, he has not been associated with the David's Cookies product.

Early life 

Liederman graduated from State University of New York, college at Old Westbury.

Career 
After practicing law for a period he became the first American to work as a cook at Troisgros, a Michelin 3 star restaurants in Roanne, France.

In 1989 Liederman co-wrote Running Through Walls, a book on how to do a startup. It includes recommendations for doing a business plan, raising money and business formation.
In 1990 David co-wrote a diet book called David's Delicious Weight-Loss Program with freelance writer Joan Schwartz.
In the mid-1990s Liederman opened a theme restaurant, Television City, in Rockefeller Center. The restaurant had an early days television motif and celebrity backing. Later in the 1990s he opened Chez Louis, an homage to Antoine Magnin of Chez l'Ami Louis in Paris, which specializes in roasted chicken.

Starting with a $30,000 investment, he opened his first David's Cookies store in Manhattan on Second Avenue, near 54th Street next door to Chez Louis.

Liederman built David's Cookies into a $35 million-a-year food retailer within six years. As of 2015 David's cookies had grown to 100 million-a-year. The batter is mixed in Fairfield, NJ and the dough is sold to distributors.

References

External links 
 

American chefs
American male chefs
Living people
Year of birth missing (living people)